Talsara (Sl. No.: 8) is a Vidhan Sabha constituency of Sundergarh district, Odisha.
Area of this constituency includes Balisankara block, Bargaon block, Subdega block and ten Gram panchayats of Lephripada block.

Elected Members

Fourteen elections held during 1961 to 2019. List of members elected from Talsara constituency are:
 2019: Bhabani Shankar Bhoi (BJP)
 2014: Prafulla Majhi (Congress)
 2009: Prafulla Majhi (Congress)
 2006 Prafulla Majhi (Congress, By-Election)
 2004: Gajadhar Majhi (Congress)
 2000: Gajadhar Majhi (Congress)
 1995: Gajadhar Majhi (Congress)
 1990: Ranjit Bhitria (Janata Dal)
 1985: Gajadhar Majhi (Congress)
 1980: Gajadhar Majhi (Congress)
 1977: Ignes Majhi (Janata Party)
 1974: Premananda Kalo (Congress)
 1971: Gangadhar Pradhan (Swatantra Party)
 1967: Gangadhar Pradhan (Swatantra Party)
 1961: Gangadhar Pradhan (Ganatantra Parishad)

2019 Election Result
In 2019 election Bharatiya Janata Party candidate Bhabani Shankar Bhoi, defeated Biju Janata Dal candidate Stephen Wilson Soreng by 16,188 votes.

2014 Election Result
In 2014 election Indian National Congress candidate Prafulla Majhi, defeated Biju Janata Dal candidate Binaya Kumar Toppo by 1,438 votes.

2009 Election Result
In 2009 election Indian National Congress candidate Prafulla Majhi, defeated Bharatiya Janata Party candidate Sahadeva Xaxa by 19,741 votes.

Notes

References

Sundergarh district
Assembly constituencies of Odisha